Dichelopa messalina is a species of moth of the family Tortricidae. It is found on Rapa Iti in the South Pacific Ocean. It is characterized by splotchy-brown coloration and a wing profile that resembles foliage in the local region.

References

Moths described in 1971
Dichelopa